William Joseph Williams, Sr. (1916 – August 23, 2009) was the co-owner of the Cincinnati Reds baseball team of the National League from  through  with his brother James Williams.  They sold the Reds to Marge Schott in 1984.

Williams was a part owner of the Cincinnati Bengals from the team's founding in 1968 until his death.

Before baseball, Williams was chairman of Western & Southern Life Insurance Company, co-founded by his father in 1888. He joined the family firm in 1939 and was on the firm's board of directors from 1954 to 1984. For a brief break, Williams was president of North American Management and Development Company. He returned to Western & Southern as president and COO and then as president and CEO.

Williams graduated from Georgetown University in 1939.

In 2006, his sons William Joseph Williams Jr. and Thomas L. Williams teamed up with a group to obtain controlling interest in the Reds.

References

External links
Cincinnati Reds timeline

1916 births
2009 deaths
Major League Baseball executives
Cincinnati Reds executives
Cincinnati Reds owners
Georgetown University alumni
American chief operating officers
American chief executives of financial services companies